Richard A. Billows is a professor of history at Columbia University.  His specialty is the Classical Mediterranean, especially the Hellenistic World post-Alexander. He holds an undergraduate degree in history from Oxford University (1978), where he was a member of Balliol College.  He earned an M.A. from King's College, University of London (1979) and a Ph.D. from the University of California, Berkeley (1985). His scholarly works include Antigonos the One-Eyed and the Creation of the Hellenic State (1990), Kings and Colonists: Aspects of Macedonian Imperialism (1995) and Marathon - How One Battle Changed Western Civilization (2010). He has taught Columbia's undergraduate survey course in Ancient Greek History.  He also regularly teaches “An Introduction to Contemporary Civilization in the West,” a Columbia College core curriculum class.

References

Year of birth missing (living people)
Living people
University of California, Berkeley alumni
Columbia University faculty
Alumni of the University of Oxford
Scholars of ancient Greek history